Deadly Affairs is an American documentary television series on Investigation Discovery that aired between September 28, 2012 and November 20, 2014. The series tells true stories of love affairs that ended up deadly and is hosted by former All My Children actress Susan Lucci. Deadly Affairs was renewed for a second season in November 2012, with the premiere on August 3, 2013. The series was renewed for a third and final season that premiered in 2014.

Episodes

Season 1 (2012)

Season 2 (2013)

Season 3 (2014)

References

External links

2010s American documentary television series
2012 American television series debuts
2014 American television series endings
English-language television shows
Investigation Discovery original programming